Telescope for Habitable Exoplanets and Interstellar/Intergalactic Astronomy (THEIA) is a NASA-proposed 4-metre optical/ultraviolet space telescope that would succeed the Hubble Space Telescope and complement the infrared-James Webb Space Telescope. THEIA would use a 40-metre occulter to block starlight so as to directly image exoplanets.

It was proposed with three main instruments and an occulter:
eXoPlanet Characterizer (XPC)
Star Formation Camera (SFC),
Ultraviolet Spectrograph (UVS)
A separate occulter spacecraft

See also
List of proposed space observatories

References

THEIA Website

External links
2010 white paper (.pdf)
Design of a telescope-occulter system for THEIA

Space telescopes